Morocco Times was an English language Moroccan Internet-based newspaper, the first of its kind.

History
Morocco Times was started on 22 November 2004, and was owned by the Maroc Soir Group, a publishing house that owns several of Morocco's major newspapers. It stopped being published at the end of October 2006, a few weeks before its second birthday.
The Morocco Times is not to be confused with The Moroccan Times, a news Magazine launched in 2014.

References

2004 establishments in Morocco
2006 disestablishments in Morocco
Publications established in 2004
Publications disestablished in 2006
Defunct newspapers published in Morocco
Moroccan news websites
Arabic-language websites
African news websites